Gregory Wheeler (born 1968) is an American logician, philosopher, and computer scientist, who specializes in formal epistemology. Much of his work has focused on imprecise probability. He is currently Professor of Philosophy and Computer Science at the Frankfurt School of Finance and Management, and has held positions at LMU Munich,  Carnegie Mellon University, the Max Planck Institute for Human Development in Berlin, and the New University of Lisbon.  He is a member of the PROGIC  steering committee, the editorial boards of Synthese, and Minds and Machines, and was the  editor-in-chief of Minds and Machines from 2011 to 2016. In 2019 he co-founded Exaloan AG, a financial technology company based in Frankfurt. He obtained a Ph.D. in philosophy and computer science from the University of Rochester under Henry Kyburg.

Select bibliography

Books
Reflections on the Foundations of Probability and Statistics: Essays in Honor of Teddy Seidenfeld, Thomas Augustin, Fabio Cozman, and Gregory Wheeler (eds.) Springer, 2022
New Challenges to Philosophy of Science, Hanne Andersen, Dennis Dieks, Wenceslao Gonzalez, Marcel Weber and Gregory Wheeler (eds.) Springer, 2013.
Probabilistic Logics and Probabilistic Networks, Rolf Haenni, Jan-Willem Romeijn, Gregory Wheeler, and Jon Williamson. The Synthese Library, Springer, 2011.
Probability and Inference: Essays in Honour of Henry E. Kyburg, Jr., William Harper and Gregory Wheeler (eds.), College Publications, 2007.

Articles
 "Discounting Desirable Gambles", Proceedings of Machine Learning Research 147: 336-346, 2021.
 "Moving Beyond Sets of Probabilities", Statistical Science 36(2): 201-204, 2021.
 "Less is More for Bayesians, Too", in Riccardo Viale (Ed.) Routledge Handbook on Bounded Rationality, pp. 471–483, 2020.
 "Dilation and Asymmetric Relevance" (w/ Arthur Paul Pedersen), Proceedings of Machine Learning Research 103: 324-26, 2019.
 "Bounded Rationality", The Stanford Encyclopedia of Philosophy, Winter 2018 Edition.
 "Resolving Peer Disagreements Through Imprecise Probabilities (w/ Lee Elkin), Nous 52(2): 260-94, 2018.
 "Scoring Imprecise Credences: A Mildly Immodest Proposal" (w/ Conor Mayo-Wilson), Philosophy and Phenomenological Research 93(1): 55–78, 2016.
 "Dilation, Disintegrations, and Delayed Decisions" (with Arthur Paul Pedersen), Proceedings of the 9th International Symposium on Imprecise Probability: Theories and Applications (ISIPTA 2015), Pescara, Italy: 227–236, 2015. 
 "Is there a Logic of Information?" Journal of Experimental and Theoretical Artificial Intelligence 27(1): 95–98, 2015. 
 "Demystifying Dilation" (with Arthur Paul Pedersen), Erkenntnis, 79(6): 1305–1342, 2014.
 "Defeat Reconsidered and Repaired", The Reasoner, 8(2): 15, 2014.
 "Character Matching and the Locke Pocket of Belief", Epistemology, Context, and Formalism, Franck Lihoreau and Manuel Rebuschi (ed.), Dordrecht: The Synthese Library, Springer, pp. 185–94, 2014.
 "Coherence and Confirmation Through Causation" (with Richard Scheines), Mind, 122(435): 135–70, 2013.
  "Models, Models, and Models", Metaphilosophy, 44(3): 293–300, 2013.
 "Objective Bayesian Calibration and the Problem of Non-convex Evidence", The British Journal for the Philosophy of Science, 63(4): 841–50, 2012.
 "Why the Hardest Logic Puzzle Ever Cannot Be Solved In Less Than Three Questions" (with Pedro Barahona), Journal of Philosophical Logic, 41(2): 493–503, 2012.
 "Formal Epistemology", appearing in The Continuum Companion to Epistemology, Andrew Cullison (ed.), Continuum Press, 227–47, 2012.
 "Explaining the Limits of Olsson's Impossibility Result", The Southern Journal of Philosophy 50(1): 136–50, 2012.
 "Modeling of Phenomena and Dynamic Logic of Phenomena" (with Boris Kovalerchuk and Leonid Perlovsky), Journal of Applied Non-classical Logics, 22(1): 51–82, 2012.
 "NO revision and NO contraction" (with Marco Alberti), Minds and Machines, 21(3): 411–30, 2011.
 "Focused Correlation, Confirmation, and the Jigsaw Puzzle of Variable Evidence" (with Max Schlosshauer), Philosophy of Science, 78(3): 376–92, 2011.
 "Evidential Probability and Objective Bayesian Epistemology" (with Jon Williamson), in Prasanta Bandyopadhyay and Malcom Forster (eds.) Handbook of the Philosophy of Statistics, San Diego: North Holland Press, pp. 307–331, 2011.
  "Causation, Association, and Confirmation" (with Richard Scheines), in Explanation, Prediction, and Confirmation, D. Dieks, W. J. Gonzalez, S. Hartmann, T. Uebel, M. Weber (eds.), The Philosophy of Science in a European Perspective Series, Dordrecht: Springer, pp. 37–51, 2011.
 "Focused Correlation and Confirmation", The British Journal for the Philosophy of Science, 60(1): 79–100, 2009.
 "Logical Relations in a Statistical Problem" (with Jan-Willem Romeijn, Rolf Haenni, and Jon Williamson), Foundations of the Formal Sciences, College Publications, London, 2009.
 "Methodological Naturalism and Epistemic Internalism" (with Luís Moniz Pereira), Synthese, 163(3): 315–328, 2008.
 "Applied Logic without Psychologism", Studia Logica, 88(1): 137–56, 2008.
 "Possible Semantics for a Common Framework for Probabilistic Logic" (with Rolf Haenni, Jan-Willem Romeijn, and Jon Williamson), in V. N. Huynh (ed.) (UncLog‘08) International Workshop on Interval Probabilistic Uncertainty and Non-Classical Logics, Ishikawa Japan, Advances in Soft Computing Series, 268–79, 2008.
 "Conditionals and Consequences", (with Henry Kyburg and Choh Man Teng), Journal of Applied Logic, 5(4): 638–50, 2007.
 "Two Puzzles Concerning Measures of Uncertainty and the Positive Boolean Connectives", 13th Portuguese Conference on Artificial Intelligence (EPIA 2007), Guimaraes, Portugal, LNAI Series, Berlin: Springer-Verlag, 170–80, 2007.
 "Humanists and Scientists", The Reasoner, 1(1): 3–4, 2007.
 "Rational Acceptance and Conjunctive/Disjunctive Absorption", Journal of Logic, Language and Information, 15(1–2): 49–63, 2006.
 "On the Structure of Rational Acceptance: Comments on Hawthorne and Bovens", Synthese, 144(2): 287–304, 2005. 
 "Epistemology and Artificial Intelligence" (with Luis Moniz Pereira), Journal of Applied Logic, 2(4): 469–493, 2004.
 "An implementation of Statistical Default Logic (with Carlos Damasio), in Logics in Artificial Intelligence (JELIA 2004 Proceedings), J. Alferes and J. Leite (eds.), LNCS Series, 121–33, 2004.
 "A Resource Bounded Default Logic", NMR 2004 Proceedings, J. Delgrande and T. Schaub (eds.), 416–22, 2004.

References

External links
 
 Minds and Machines, edited by Wheeler

1968 births
Living people
American philosophers
American computer scientists
University of Rochester alumni